Burdett is a hamlet in Alberta, Canada within the County of Forty Mile No. 8. Also, Burdett is regarded as the site of Canada's first irrigation pivot.

History 
The community is named for Angela Burdett-Coutts, 1st Baroness Burdett-Coutts, a railroad promoter. Previously incorporated as a village on June 30, 1913, Burdett dissolved to hamlet status on January 1, 2003.

Demographics 

Notable people 
 Harry Edwin Strom (July 7, 1914 – October 2, 1984) was a Canadian politician of Swedish descent, who served as Premier of Alberta between 1968 and 1971, and was born in Burdett.

See also 
List of communities in Alberta
List of former urban municipalities in Alberta
List of hamlets in Alberta

References

County of Forty Mile No. 8
Designated places in Alberta
Former villages in Alberta
Hamlets in Alberta
Populated places disestablished in 2003